Kishin Kawabata (川畑輝鎮) (born April 29, 1965) is a Japanese professional wrestler, currently performing for Pro Wrestling Noah.

Championships and accomplishments
Pro Wrestling Noah
GHC Openweight / Hardcore Tag Team Championship (2 times)1
GHC Hardcore Tag Team Championship Tournament (2007) - with Kentaro Shiga
Flemish Wrestling Cup (2007)

1 When the GHC Openweight Hardcore Championship was rechristened to the GHC Hardcore Tag Team Championship, Kawabata won the title with Kentaro Shiga.

References

External links
 Kishin Kawabata at PUROLOVE.com

Japanese male professional wrestlers
1965 births
Living people
GHC Openweight Hardcore Champions